G-Sync is a proprietary adaptive sync technology developed by Nvidia aimed primarily at eliminating screen tearing and the need for software alternatives such as Vsync. G-Sync eliminates screen tearing by allowing a video display's refresh rate to adapt to the frame rate of the outputting device (graphics card/integrated graphics) rather than the outputting device adapting to the display, which could traditionally be refreshed halfway through the process of a frame being output by the device, resulting in screen tearing, or two or more frames being shown at once. In order for a device to use G-Sync, it must contain a proprietary G-Sync module sold by Nvidia. AMD has released a similar technology for displays, called FreeSync, which has the same function as G-Sync yet is royalty-free.

Nvidia built a special collision avoidance feature to avoid the eventuality of a new frame being ready while a duplicate is being drawn on screen (something that could generate lag and/or stutter) in which case the module anticipates the refresh and waits for the next frame to be completed. Overdriving pixels also becomes tricky in a non-fixed refresh scenario, and solutions predicting when the next refresh is going to happen and accordingly adjusting the overdrive value must be implemented and tuned for each panel in order to avoid ghosting.

Hardware

The module carries all the functional parts. It is based around an Altera Arria V GX family FPGA featuring 156K logic elements, 396 DSP blocks and 67 LVDS channels. It is produced on the TSMC 28LP process and paired with three DDR3L DRAM chips to attain a certain bandwidth, for an aggregate 768MB capacity. The employed FPGA also features a LVDS interface to drive the monitor panel. It is meant to replace common scalers and be easily integrated by monitor manufacturers, who only have to take care of the power delivery circuit board and input connections.

GPU: 
Nvidia GeForce GTX 650 Ti Boost GPU or higher. (G-Sync, G-Sync Ultimate)
Geforce 10 series (Pascal) and above. (G-Sync Compatible)

Driver: 
R340.52 or higher.
R417.71 or higher (G-Sync Compatible)

Operating system:
Windows 7, 8, 8.1, 10 and 11
Linux, FreeBSD, Solaris
Windows 10 x64 (G-Sync Compatible)

System requirement: 
Must support DisplayPort 1.2 directly from the GPU. (Displayport 1.2a for G-Sync Compatible)
 
Monitor:
G-Sync monitor connected natively via DisplayPort v1.2 or higher (1.2a for G-Sync Compatible)

Criticism
G-Sync faces some criticism due to its proprietary nature and the fact that it is still being promoted when free alternatives exist, such as the VESA standard Adaptive-Sync which is an optional feature of DisplayPort version 1.2a. While AMD's FreeSync relies on the above-mentioned optional component of DisplayPort 1.2a, G-Sync requires an Nvidia-made module in place of the usual scaler in the display in order for it to function properly with select Nvidia GeForce graphics cards, such as the ones from the GeForce 10 series (Pascal). However, there do exist G-Sync compatible monitors that can also utilize AMD's FreeSync. The G-Sync module itself has also been criticized for drawing power when the monitor is switched off, while comparable technologies don't draw any power when the monitor is switched off. A basic test by technology YouTuber JayzTwoCents showed that monitors with the G-Sync module draw approximately 14W continuously when the monitor is off, and that comparable monitors without the G-Sync module draw 0.0W when the monitor is off.

List of G-Sync-enabled monitors

List of upcoming G-Sync-enabled monitors

List of G-Sync enabled desktop GPUs

G-Sync notebook
Nvidia announced that G-Sync will be available to notebook manufacturers and that in this case, it would not require a special module since the GPU is directly connected to the display without a scaler in between.
According to Nvidia, fine tuning is still possible given the fact that all notebooks of the same model will have the same LCD panel, variable overdrive will be calculated by shaders running on the GPU, and a form of frame collision avoidance will also be implemented.

"Big Format" gaming displays
At CES 2018 Nvidia announced a line of large gaming monitors built by HP, Asus and Acer with 65-inch panels, 4K, HDR, as well as G-Sync support. The inclusion of G-Sync modules make the monitors among the first TV-sized displays to feature variable refresh-rates.

G-Sync Compatible displays
At CES 2019, Nvidia announced that they will support variable refresh rate monitors with FreeSync technology under a new standard named G-Sync Compatible. All monitors under this new standard have been tested by Nvidia to meet their baseline requirements for variable refresh rate and will enable G-Sync automatically when used with an Nvidia GPU. However, users with any Freesync monitor, including those that are not officially certified may choose to enable the G-Sync option in the Nvidia Control Panel.
Unlike G-Sync, G-Sync Compatible displays are only compatible with the GTX 10-series and onwards.

See also 
 Variable refresh rate
 FreeSync
 Refresh rate

References

External links
 Nvidia G-Sync overview

Computer display standards
Film and video technology
Nvidia